Special Protection Areas for birds in Poland are called OSOPs.
As of 2005, 72 OSOPs were designated.

See also

 Protected areas of Poland

References

Protected areas of Poland
Poland
Poland
Protected
Nature conservation in Poland